The Association of Illustrators (AOI) is a British trade association for illustration, to advance and protect illustrators' rights. It was established in the United Kingdom in 1973.

The AOI promotes and encourages commercial and ethical standards within the industry, to improve the standing of illustration as a profession. It actively campaigns to maintain and protect the rights of its members, through the Pro-Action Campaign and Liaison Group, the British Copyright Council, the Creators Rights Alliance and the European Illustrators Forum.

With over 1,800 members, including freelance illustrators, agents, students, colleges and commissioners, the AOI provides support, advice and education to members of the industry worldwide, at every stage of their career.

Notable illustrators among its patrons include Ralph Steadman, Sir Quentin Blake, Shirley Hughes and Raymond Briggs.

History 
 1976 - Launch of AOI’s annual exhibition of British illustration, and its linked publication Images
 1989 - Publication of Rights by AOI, to help illustrators with legal issues such as contracts and copyright
 2002 - Launch of www.theaoi.com as a general resource for both commissioners and illustrators.

See also 
 Society of Strip Illustration

References

External links 
 

1973 establishments in the United Kingdom
Arts organisations based in the United Kingdom
Professional associations based in the United Kingdom
Organisations based in the City of Westminster
Trade unions in the United Kingdom